Slobodan Petrovic Jr. (born 22 February 1974 in Trappenkamp) is a Yugoslav-German electronic dance music DJ, producer and is the founder of Aqualoop Records in 2000. He is best known by his alias, Pulsedriver.

Career

Early life and career
In 1994, Petrovic released his first own single, under the alias Aqualoop: "Twilight Zone". Further singles were released under this name.

In 1997, the project "Pulsedriver" was born.

The first commercial success came with the single "Kiss That Sound" which was his first entry into the German sales chart. Further follow-up releases "I Dominate U", "Take U High" and "Your Spirit is Shining" were also successful. The single "Cambodia", a cover of a Kim Wilde song, gave him his first Top 10 single in Germany, a Top 5 single in Austria and achieved chart positions in other countries in Europe. Further singles, such as "Din Daa Daa", "Time", "Move for Freedom", "Galaxy", "Vagabonds", "Slammin'", "Insane" and "Beat Bangs" as well as the albums Selected, Sequence and Night Moves all made it into the sales chart.

2000-present
In the 2000s, Pulsedriver founded the record label Aqualoop Records. Pulsedriver was named "Best National Remixer" in the years 2002, 2003 and 2004 in succession. Currently Pulsedriver has made over 200 remixes for acts worldwide.

Petriovic has had over 25 releases featured in international sales charts.

Projects

 Aqualoop 
 Beatmachine
 Dance United
 Diabolito
 DJ Tibby
 Don Esteban
 Driver & Face
 Eve
 Future Trance United
 Hard Body Babes
 Hardhead
 Jack Attack
 Killa Squad
 Klubbdriver
 La Vallée
 Lagos
 Limelight
 Liquid Motion
 Malibu Drive
 Matisse
 Minotaurus
 Monolith
 Overtune
 Pinball
 Pornrockers
 Riphouse
 Sal De Sol
 Secret Service
 Skagen Inc.
 T-Bone
 The Trancecore Project
 Tommy & Tibby
 Topmodelz
 Trans Balear
 Tube
 Typ Of Terra

References

External links
Official Website
Official MySpace

1974 births
Electronic dance music DJs
Eurodance musicians
German DJs
German electronic musicians
German record producers
German trance musicians
Living people
Remixers
Yugoslav musicians